is a railway station on the Seibu Shinjuku Line in Nerima, Tokyo, Japan, operated by the private railway operator Seibu Railway.

Lines
Only all-stations "Local" services and "Semi express" services stop at this station.

Station layout
The station structure is located over the tracks, with one set of ticket barriers, and station entrances on the north and south sides.

Platforms
The station has two side platforms serving two tracks.

History
The station opened on 16 April 1927.

Station numbering was introduced on all Seibu Railway lines during fiscal 2012, with Musashi-Seki Station becoming "SS14".

Passenger statistics
In fiscal 2013, the station was the 34th busiest on the Seibu network with an average of 28,803 passengers daily.

The passenger figures for previous years are as shown below.

Surrounding area

North side
 Honryuji Temple
 Sophia University Shakujii campus
 Tokyo Shakujii High School
 Tokyo Joshi Gakuin Junior & Senior High School
 Sekimachikita Elementary School
 Shakujii River

South side
 Nerima Ward Office
 Shakujii Fire Station
 Musashiseki Park

References

External links

 Musashi-Seki Station information (Seibu) 

Railway stations in Tokyo
Railway stations in Japan opened in 1927